Charles Edward (Ed) Whitaker (June 27, 1939 – August 22, 2014) was an American stock car team owner. A native of Bristol, Virginia, he fielded a team in the NASCAR Busch Series for 20 seasons, with drivers including Dale Earnhardt Jr., Mark Martin, Alan Kulwicki, and Davey Allison. Whitaker's team scored 28 wins in the series, with 20 of them by Harry Gant. Whitaker also fielded a car for six races in the Winston Cup Series between 1978 and 1980 with driver John Utsman.

References

External links

1939 births
2014 deaths
People from Bristol, Virginia
NASCAR team owners